Tülü or Tyulyu or Tyuli may refer to:
Tülü, Balakan, Azerbaijan
Tülü, Lerik, Azerbaijan
Tülü, Saimbeyli, Turkey

See also
Tulu (disambiguation)